Osini is a comune (municipality) in the Province of Nuoro in the Italian region Sardinia, located about  northeast of Cagliari and about  southwest of Tortolì.

In its territory is located the Nuraghe Serbissi.

Osini borders the following municipalities: Cardedu, Gairo, Jerzu, Lanusei, Loceri, Tertenia, Ulassai, Ussassai.

Demographic Evolution

References

Cities and towns in Sardinia